The Hudson-Grace-Borreson House is a historic house at 719 West Barraque Street in Pine Bluff, Arkansas.  With an evolutionary construction history dating to about 1830, it is a unique and distinctive blend of Greek Revival, Second Empire, and New Orleans French architectural styles.  It is a -story wood-frame structure, finished in bevel siding, with a dormered mansard roof that has an original iron railing at the boundary between the roof slopes.  It has a porch extending across the front, featuring hexagonal posts and delicate turned woodwork.  The house began as a two-room cabin about 1830, and was enlarged and altered in 1860.  Its most prominent owner, William Grace, was a local lawyer, politician, and veteran of the American Civil War.

The house was listed on the National Register of Historic Places in 1971.

See also
National Register of Historic Places listings in Jefferson County, Arkansas

References

Greek Revival architecture in Arkansas
Houses completed in 1830
Houses in Pine Bluff, Arkansas
Houses on the National Register of Historic Places in Arkansas
National Register of Historic Places in Pine Bluff, Arkansas
Victorian architecture in Arkansas